Alexander Roy Harwood (1897–1980), better known as A. R. Harwood, or Dick Harwood, was an Australian film director and producer who also worked in exhibition. He was inspired to become a filmmaker when he was posted to Tahiti to work for an insurance company and watched the shooting of Never the Twain Shall Meet (1925). He returned to Australia and produced and directed The Man Who Forgot (1927).

Harwood went on to make a number of feature films over the next twenty years.

Film historians Andrew Pike and Ross Cooper said of him that "what Harwood lacked in talent as a director, he made up for in perseverance, usually in the face of formidable shortages of finance and equipment."

He also worked as an insurance broker, real estate agent, theatre manager and chief executive for the Miss Australia Quest.

Harwood was married with one daughter.

Credits
The Man Who Forgot (1927) – feature
Out of the Shadows (1931) – unfinished feature
Spur of the Moment (1931) – feature
Isle of Intrigue (1931) – feature
Secret of the Skies (1934) – feature
Something Different (1934) – musical variety show
Pearl Lust (1936) – feature for home movie market
The Avenger (1937) – feature
Show Business (1938) – feature
Night Club (1952) – feature

References

External links
 
A. R. Harwood at the National Film and Sound Archive

1897 births
1980 deaths
Australian film directors